Systems philosophy is a discipline aimed at constructing a new philosophy (in the sense of worldview) by using systems concepts. The discipline was first described by Ervin Laszlo in his 1972 book Introduction to Systems Philosophy: Toward a New Paradigm of Contemporary Thought. It has been described as the "reorientation of thought and world view ensuing from the introduction of "systems" as a new scientific paradigm".

Overview 
Soon after Laszlo founded systems philosophy it was placed in context by Ludwig von Bertalanffy, one of the founders of general system theory, when he categorized three domains within systemics namely:
 "Systems science", which is concerned with "scientific exploration and theory of "systems" in the various sciences...and general system theory as doctrine of principles applying to all systems";
 "Systems technology", which is concerned with "the problems arising in modern technology and society, comprising both the "hardware" of computers, automation self-regulating machinery etc., and the "software" of new theoretical developments and disciplines"; and
 "Systems philosophy", which is concerned with "the new philosophy of nature" which regards the world as a great organization" that is "organismic" rather than "mechanistic" in nature.

Systems philosophy consists of four main areas:
 "Systems ontology", which is concerned "with what is meant by "system" and how systems are realized at various levels of the world of observation";
 "Systems paradigms", which is concerned with developing worldviews which "takes [humankind] as one species of concrete and actual system, embedded in encompassing natural hierarchies of likewise concrete and actual physical, biological, and social systems";
 "Systems axiology", which is concerned with developing models of systems that involve "humanistic concerns", and views "symbols, values, social entities and cultures" as "something very "real"" and having an "embeddedness in a cosmic order of hierarchies"; and
 "Applied systems philosophy", which is concerned with using the insights from the other branches of systems philosophy to solve practical problems, especially social and philosophical ones.

The term "systems philosophy" is often used as a convenient shorthand to refer to "the philosophy of systems", but this usage can be misleading. The philosophy of systems is in fact merely the element of systems philosophy called "systems ontology" by von Bertalanffy and "systems metaphysics" by Laszlo. Systems ontology provides important grounding for systems thinking but does not encompass the essential focus of systems philosophy, which is about articulating a worldview grounded in systems perspectives and humanistic concerns.

Origin and development of systems philosophy

The founding of systems philosophy

Systems philosophy was founded by Ervin Laszlo in 1972 with his book Introduction to Systems Philosophy: Toward a New Paradigm of Contemporary Thought. The Foreword was written by Ludwig von Bertalanffy.

"Systems philosophy", in Ervin Laszlo's sense of the term, means using the systems perspective to model the nature of reality, and to use this to solve important human problems (Laszlo, 1972). Laszlo developed the idea behind systems philosophy independently of von Bertalanffy's work on General System Theory (published in 1968), but they met before Introduction to Systems Philosophy was published and the decision to call the new discipline "systems philosophy" was their joint one. Writing Introduction to Systems Philosophy took five years, and in his autobiography Laszlo calls it "my major work".

Laszlo's "great idea", that made systems philosophy possible, was that the existence of a general system theory that captures the "patterns" that recur across the Systemics, who themselves capture "patterns" that recur across the specialized disciplines, entails that the world is organised as a whole, and thus has an underlying unity. This view was taken up by other systems scientists such as Béla H. Bánáthy, who regarded systems philosophy as one of four distinct "conceptual domains" of systems inquiry alongside theory, methodology and application, and the systems philosopher David Rousseau, who following Laszlo reiterated that GST provides a formal model of the nature of Nature, but that an understanding of the nature of Nature requires an interpretation of GST involving concrete commitments that systems philosophy aims to provide.

David Pouvreau has suggested that this quandary can be resolved by the coinage of the new term "general systemology", to replace the usage of GST in the sense of the encompassing conception that the later Von Bertalanffy envisaged.

Perspectivism vs. realism in systems philosophy
An important debate in systems philosophy reflects on the nature of natural systems, and asks whether reality is really composed of objectively real systems, or whether the concept of "natural systems" merely reflects a way in which humans might regard the world in terms relative to their own concerns.

Ervin Laszlo's original conception of systems philosophy was as "a philosophy of natural systems", and as such to use the systems paradigm to show how nature is organized, and how that organization gives rise to the functional properties that we find exercised in the processes in Nature. However, this was immediately problematic, because it clearly is the case that natural systems are open systems, and continuously exchange matter and energy with their environment. This might make it look as if the boundary between a system and its environment is a function of the interests of the observer, and not something inherent in an actually existing system. This was taken by some to mean that system boundaries are subjective constructions, e.g., C. West Churchman argued that "boundaries are social or personal constructs that define the limits of the knowledge that is taken as pertinent in an analysis".

Ervin Laszlo acknowledged the problem without conceding to an ultimate relativism, saying "we can conceive of no radical separation between forming and being formed, and between substance and space and time…the universe is conceived as a continuum [in which] spatio-temporal events disclose themselves as "stresses" or "tensions" within the constitutive matrix…the cosmic matrix evolves in patterned flows…some flows hit upon configurations of intrinsic stability and thus survive, despite changes in their evolving environment…these we call systems." In this way Ervin Laszlo accommodated the intrinsic continuity of the cosmos understood as a plenum while insisting that it contained real systems whose properties emerge from the inherent dynamics of the universe.

Although solving social problems means taking social norms and perspectives into account, systems philosophy proposes that these problems have a "proper" solution because they are about real systems: as Alexander Laszlo pointed out, natural systems are "a complex of interacting parts that are interrelated in such a way that the interactions between them sustain a boundary-maintaining entity". In this way, the identity of a system is maintained over time despite continuing interactions with a changing environment. Systems can be destroyed or transformed, but absent radical interactions (e.g. the fission of an atom or the death of an organism) their identity is dynamically maintained by internal (autopoietic) processes. Although we can draw the boundaries around conceptual systems in ways that serve our needs or purposes, nature has (according to systems philosophy) intrinsic ways of drawing boundaries, and if we mismatch these in our models our 'solutions' might not work very well in practice.

In this way the answer to the ontological question about natural systems (do they exist?) is made conditional on epistemological virtue considerations: systems can be argued to exist if systems practice produces positive results in the real world. This debate in systems philosophy thus parallels the wider discussion in academia about the existence of a real world and the possibility of having objective knowledge about it (see e.g. the "science wars"), in which the technological success of science is often used as an argument favoring realism over relativism or constructivism. The systemic debate is far from resolved, as indeed is the case with the wider debate about constructivism, because natural systems include ones that exhibit values, purposes, and intentionality, and it is unclear how to explain such properties given what is known about the foundational nature of natural systems. This debate is therefore connected with the ones in philosophy of mind about the grounding of consciousnesses, and in axiology about the grounding of values.

Research centers 
 Centre for Systems Philosophy, UK
 Centre for Systems Studies, University of Hull, UK
 Club of Budapest, Hungary
 Leo Apostel Centre for Interdisciplinary Studies (CLEA), Free University of Brussels, Belgium
 Worldviews, Belgium

References

Further reading 
 Diederik Aerts, B. D'Hooghe, R. Pinxten, and I. Wallerstein (Eds.). (2011). Worldviews, Science And Us: Interdisciplinary Perspectives On Worlds, Cultures And Society – Proceedings Of The Workshop On Worlds, Cultures And Society. World Scientific Publishing Company.
 Diederik Aerts, Leo Apostel, B. De Moor, S. Hellemans, E. Maex, H. Van Belle, and J. Van der Veken (1994). Worldviews: from fragmentation to integration. Brussels: VUB Press.
 Archie Bahm (1981). Five Types of Systems Philosophy. International Journal of General Systems, 6(4), 233–237.
 Archie Bahm (1983). Five systems concepts of society. Behavioral Science, 28(3), 204–218.
 Gregory Bateson (1979). Mind and nature : a necessary unity. New York: Dutton.
 Gregory Bateson (2000). Steps to an ecology of mind. Chicago IL: University of Chicago Press.
 Kenneth Boulding (1985). The World as a Total System. Beverly Hills, CA.: Sage Publications.
 Mario Bunge (1977). Ontology I: The furniture of the world. Reidel.
 Mario Bunge (1979). Ontology II: A World of Systems. Dordrecht: Reidel.
 Mario Bunge (2010). Matter and Mind: A Philosophical Inquiry. New York, NY: Springer.
 Francis Heylighen (2000). What is a world view? In F. Heylighen, C. Joslyn, & V. Turchin (Eds.), Principia Cybernetica Web (Principia Cybernetica, Brussels), http://cleamc11.vub.ac.be/WORLVIEW.html.
 Arthur Koestler (1967). The Ghost in the Machine. Henry Regnery Co.
 Alexander Laszlo & S. Krippner S. (1998) Systems theories: Their origins, foundations, and development. In J.S. Jordan (Ed.), Systems theories and a priori aspects of perception. Amsterdam: Elsevier Science, 1998. Ch. 3, pp. 47–74.
 Laszlo, A. (1998) Humanistic and systems sciences: The birth of a third culture. Pluriverso, 3(1), April 1998. pp. 108–121.
 Laszlo, A. & Laszlo, E. (1997) The contribution of the systems sciences to the humanities. Systems Research and Behavioral Science, 14(1), April 1997. pp. 5–19.
 Ervin Laszlo (1972a). Introduction to Systems Philosophy: Toward a New Paradigm of Contemporary Thought. New York N.Y.: Gordon & Breach.
 Laszlo, E. (1972b). The Systems View of the World: The Natural Philosophy of the New Developments in the Sciences. George Braziller.
 Laszlo, E. (1973). A Systems Philosophy of Human Values. Systems Research and Behavioral Science, 18(4), 250–259.
 Laszlo, E. (1996). The Systems View of the World: a Holistic Vision for our Time. Cresskill NJ: Hampton Press.
 Laszlo, E. (2005). Religion versus Science: The Conflict in Reference to Truth Value, not Cash Value. Zygon, 40(1), 57–61.
 Laszlo, E. (2006a). Science and the Reenchantment of the Cosmos: The Rise of the Integral Vision of Reality. Inner Traditions.
 Laszlo, E. (2006b). New Grounds for a Re-Union Between Science and Spirituality. World Futures: Journal of General Evolution, 62(1), 3.
 Gerald Midgley (2000) Systemic Intervention: Philosophy, Methodology, and Practice. Springer.
 Rousseau, D. (2013) Systems Philosophy and the Unity of Knowledge, forthcoming in Systems Research and Behavioral Science.
 Rousseau, D. (2011) Minds, Souls and Nature: A Systems-Philosophical Analysis of the Mind-Body Relationship. (PhD Thesis, University of Wales, Trinity Saint David, School of Theology, Religious Studies and Islamic Studies).
 Jan Smuts (1926). Holism and Evolution. New York: Macmillan Co.
 Vidal, C. (2008). Wat is een wereldbeeld? [What is a worldview?]. In H. Van Belle & J. Van der Veken (Eds.), Nieuwheid denken. De wetenschappen en het creatieve aspect van de werkelijkheid [Novel thoughts: Science and the Creative Aspect of Reality]. Acco Uitgeverij.*
 Jennifer Wilby (2005). Applying a Critical Systematic Review Process to Hierarchy Theory. Presented at the 2005 Conference of the Japan Advanced Institute of Science and Technology. Retrieved from https://dspace.jaist.ac.jp/dspace/handle/10119/3846
 Wilby, J. (2011). A New Framework for Viewing the Philosophy, Principles and Practice of Systems Science. Systems Research and Behavioral Science, 28(5), 437–442.

External links 
 Systems Philosophy and Applications: A Bibliography by W. Huitt, Valdosta, Georgia, USA, last revised December 2007.
 Organization and Process: Systems Philosophy and Whiteheadian Metaphysics by James E. Huchingson.

Philosophy of science
Philosophy of technology
Philosophy